Chandpur Government College is a college in Chandpur, Bangladesh. It is one of the oldest and renowned colleges in Chandpur as well as in Chittagong division. The college is located in Chandpur City on 16.56 acres of land including. It offers higher secondary education (HSC). It has Honours and Masters programs as well which are affiliated to the National University of Bangladesh.

History 
College is one of the renowned colleges of Bangladesh. The college is a symbol of pride for the inhabitants of Chandpur. Hussain shaheed suhrawardy, Prime Minister of undivided Bengal, laid the foundation of the college on 15 June 1946. World War II acted as the catalyst behind the establishment of the college. The British Government had transferred the Intermediate section of Comilla Victoria College at Hasan Ali Govt. High School of Chandpur for the cause of safety as the combined/allied forces were being annihilated by the attack of Japanese during the end of World War II (1939 – 1945). When the section of the Victoria College had been withdrawn in 1946 after the end of the war, the local elites and educationists took a unanimous decision to set up a college permanently at Chandpur. It was decided to start the function of the college at the left-out army camp of the Aziz Ahmed Maidan. According to the decision, the college started its glorious journey with eminent educationist Mr. Paresh Chandra Ganguli at the chair of the Principal. With the inception of the college activities, the initiative of setting up its own building was taken. Different social elites, educationists, benevolent, and organizations came forward spontaneously with the donation of money and land.

Campus

Academic Buildings 
There are five academic buildings:

 Main Building (Administrative Building)
 Shaheed Raju Building
 Academic Building-1
 Academic Building-2
 Academic Building-3

Library 
The library is situated in main building of the college. It has a collection around 30,000 books.

Sports facilities 
There is a big sports field in this institution and also there is a basketball court.

Residential student halls 
There are two residential halls for boys:

 Shaheed Zia Hostel
 Sher-e-Bangla Hostel

There are two residential halls for girls:

 Sheikh Hasina Girl's Hostel
 Bangamata Begum Fojilatunnesa Mujib Girl's Hostel

Mosque 
There is a Mosque in the college campus. It's called Chandpur Government College Central Mosque.

Academics 
Chandpur Government College offers HSC, four years Honours, and one year Masters course in various majors.

HSC level 

 Science
 Business Studies
 Humanities

Honours and Masters level

Organizations 
Chandpur Government College has various types of social organizations to implement its student skill.

 BNCC
 Rover Scout
 Red Crescent Youth
 Chandpur Government College Debate Forum

External links 

 Official Website

Colleges in Chandpur District
National University, Bangladesh
Colleges in Bangladesh
Educational institutions established in 1946
Chandpur District
Colleges affiliated to National University, Bangladesh